Juho Tolppola (born 5 October 1981) is a Finnish professional boxer who has challenged twice for the European super-lightweight title in 2008. As an amateur he is a three-time Finnish national champion and a bronze medallist at the 2000 European Championships. From 2015 to 2017, Tolppola served a two-year ban from boxing due to doping.

Amateur career
In his amateur career, Tolppola scored 135 wins in 175 fights, including four consecutive medals at the Finnish national amateur championships: gold in 1998 (light-flyweight), 2000 (flyweight) and 2001 (bantamweight), and silver in 1999 (bantamweight). At the 2000 European Championships, he won a bronze medal in the flyweight division.

Professional career
Tolppola made his professional debut on 10 December 2001, winning a four-round points decision over Anton Vontszemu. His first opportunity at a regional championship came on 26 November 2004 against Michele Orlando for the vacant IBF International welterweight title. Fighting outside of Finland for the first time as a professional, Tolppola lost a narrow twelve-round split decision in Orlando's native Italy. Two months later, on 28 January 2005, Tolppola went on the road again, losing a ten-round points decision to David Barnes in Scotland.

Between 2007 and 2009, Tolppola challenged for both the European and European Union super-lightweight titles twice each, but lost all of these bouts. In his fourth attempt, against Giuseppe Lauri on 30 May 2009, the fight ended in a highly controversial manner when Tolppola was first disqualified after ten rounds due to repeated fouls, after which his father stormed the ring and punched the referee.

After taking a five-year break from the sport, Tolppola returned to the ring on 9 May 2014. He would score three consecutive wins by unanimous decision before challenging unbeaten Matias Laitinen for the vacant Finnish welterweight title on 23 May 2015. Tolppola won a wide ten-round unanimous decision, but in September the result was changed to a no contest after he failed a drugs test for the use of hydrochlorothiazide (a diuretic to aid weight loss). The Finnish Professional Boxing Association subsequently handed Tolppola a two-year ban from boxing, effective from the Laitinen fight.

In April 2016, Tolppola announced his intention to appeal the decision, maintaining his innocence and calling into question the Association's testing procedures. This appeal was rejected by a court in June of that year, who determined that there were no sufficient grounds for lifting his ban. Boxing promoter Joona Jalkanen announced in October that Tolppola would return to the ring immediately after his ban was lifted, on 13 May 2017, and would be looking to challenge for a European title at some stage, but the fight did not take place.

Professional boxing record

References

External links

Light-welterweight boxers
Welterweight boxers
Living people
1981 births
Sportspeople from Vantaa
Finnish male boxers
Doping cases in boxing
Light-flyweight boxers
Flyweight boxers
Bantamweight boxers